Mona Darling is an Indian horror-thriller film written, and directed by Shashi Sudigala. The film is produced by First Ray Films and distributed By Vashu Bhagnani Release.

Cast
 Anshuman Jha as Wiki
 Divya Menon as Sarah
 Suzanna Mukherjee as Mona 
 Sanjay Suri as Dean of IST

References

2017 films
2010s Hindi-language films